Masjed, in Iran, may refer to:
 Masjed, Hamadan
 Masjed, Khuzestan
 Masjed, West Azerbaijan